Robert Graham 'Bob' Latford (July 29, 1935 – July 23, 2003) was a NASCAR historian best known for developing the point system used in the NASCAR Cup Series from 1975 to 2010 (slightly modified in later years), NASCAR Xfinity Series and NASCAR Truck Series.

Career
Latford began his 55-year career in motorsports media and public relations by selling programs for the Daytona Beach races in 1946 for NASCAR founder Bill France, the father of Bill France, Jr. who was one of Latford's classmates at Seabreeze High School. Following a stint in the U.S. Armed Forces, Latford was attending the University of Florida when he was offered a public relations job at the new Daytona International Speedway by France, Sr. and Houston Lawing. The first Daytona 500 took place in 1959.

Later on, Latford served as a public relations official and press box director at several tracks, including Charlotte Motor Speedway. He devised NASCAR's most popular points system, which was adopted in 1975, which NASCAR used two different versions for their series from 1975 until 2010. In the system, the winner received 175 points, second 170 points, and other positions exactly the same as the current points system.

From 1979–2000, Latford was the statistician for all NASCAR broadcasts on CBS.

Latford was also a color commentator for the 1988 Miller High Life 500 at Pocono Raceway.

Latford also published a weekly newsletter for motorsports journalists, The Inside Line, along with four books (see below).

Latford worked his final race in the press box at North Carolina Motor Speedway, the Pop Secret 400 on October 22, 2000.

On July 23, 2003 Latford died at the age of 67.

Legacy
At the annual North Carolina Auto Racing Hall Of Fame ceremony in October 2003, NASCAR Scene editor and hall of fame board member Deb Williams paid tribute to Latford.

In 2004, Latford was posthumously awarded the National Motorsports Press Association/Pocono Spirit Award which "recognizes character and achievement in the face of adversity as well as sportsmanship and contributions to motorsports."

Books
 Built For Speed (1999 HC, 2002 PB) Courage Books. PB 
 50 Years Of NASCAR (2002) Carlton Books.
 NASCAR: A Celebration (2002) Carlton Books. 
 ARCA 50th Anniversary Book (2002) Written for ARCA

References

External links
 Bob Latford – A Friend To Racing by John Davison (fastmachines.com

NASCAR people
1935 births
2003 deaths